Angelica Moratelli (born 17 August 1994) is a professional tennis player from Italy.

On 23 September 2013, she achieved her career-high singles ranking of world No. 318. On 26 December 2022, she peaked at No. 170 in the WTA doubles rankings. Moratelli has won nine singles and 27 doubles titles on the ITF Women's Circuit.

She made her main-draw debut on the WTA Tour at the 2016 Italian Open in the doubles draw, partnering Claudia Giovine. They won their first-round match against Xu Yifan and Zheng Saisai.

ITF Circuit finals

Singles: 17 (9 titles 8 runner–ups)

Doubles: 49 (27 titles, 22 runner–ups)

References

External links
 
 

1994 births
Living people
Italian female tennis players
21st-century Italian women